The Last Guy is a PlayStation Network title for the PlayStation 3. It is available as a downloadable game on the PlayStation Store. The game is a rescue game in which the eponymous player character must guide civilians to escape from monster-infested cities. On July 31, 2008, it was released in Japan. It was released in North America and Europe on August 28, 2008.

Gameplay
The Last Guy is played from a top-down perspective of a city that has been overrun by giant monsters/yokai, which the game refers to as "zombies". The player controls the titular The Last Guy, whose job is to find and lead stranded civilians to the escape zone before the time runs out, while evading enemy creatures. He can dash, manipulate the line of people following him, and use thermal imaging to find survivors. Over twelve playable locations include cities from North America, Europe and Asia. Features include a leaderboard for each city, a leaderboard for overall score, and counters that record the number of people rescued. Each city also hosts four VIPs which, when rescued, add bonus points to the final score and unlock additional bonus stages.

In May 2009, the game was updated to include trophy support and allow downloadable content to be purchased from the PlayStation Network.

Development
The Last Guy uses high-resolution satellite imagery from Google Earth to render real world cities.

Reception

The Last Guy received positive reviews. IGN gave it a 9 out of 10 calling it "an outstanding title that's challenging, funny, and fresh."  Gaming Target was also positive, saying that it "features just enough quirky and clever gameplay to be worth the $10" and later selecting the game for their list of "40 Games We'll Still Be Playing From 2008"

References

External links
 Official website

2008 video games
Maze games
PlayStation 3 games
PlayStation 3-only games
PlayStation Network games
Sony Interactive Entertainment games
Video games developed in Japan
Video games about zombies